Among the collections of the Russian Museum in Saint Petersburg in Russia are some of the greatest pieces of Russian art in the world.

The Museum houses collections of sculpture, objets d'art, drawings and paintings including the famous picture gallery.

Icons
The Angel with Golden Hair

18th-19th century
 
 The Last Day of Pompeii by Karl Brullov, 1830–33
 The Ninth Wave by Ivan Aivazovsky, 1850
 Barge Haulers on the Volga by Ilya Repin, 1870–1873
 Sadko by Ilya Repin (1876)
 Reply of the Zaporozhian Cossacks by Ilya Repin, 1880–1891
 Moonlit Night on the Dnieper by Arkhip Kuindzhi, 1880
 The Great Taking of the Veil by Mikhail Nesterov, 1898
 Portrait of Murtaza Kuli Khan by Vladimir Borovikovsky
 The Brazen Serpent by Fyodor Bruni
 Phrine at the Festival of Poseidon at the Eleusinia by Henryk Siemiradzki
 Christ's Appearance to St Mary Magdalene by Alexander Ivanov
 Portrait of Maria Rumyantseva by Aleksey Antropov
 Bogatyr by Viktor Vasnetsov
 Portrait of an Unknown Woman in a Violet Dress by Evgraf Fedorovich Krendovsky
 Last Supper by Nikolai Ge

Modern (19th-20th century)
 Ceremonial Sitting of the State Council on 7 May 1901 Marking the Centenary of its Foundation by Ilya Repin, 1903
 Black Circle by Kazimir Malevich
 Red Square by Kazimir Malevich
 Red Cavalry by Kazimir Malevich, 1932
 Portrait of Ivan Pavlov by Mikhail Nesterov, 1930
 Portrait of Jack Hunter by Nicolai Fechin
 Portrait of Chaliapin by Boris Kustodiev
 Cyclist by Natalia Goncharova

Soviet art

 A Fascist Flew Past by Arkady Plastov
 Cherry by Yevsey Moiseyenko
 Mothers, Sisters by Yevsey Moiseyenko

Naïve art
 Katya Medvedeva

References

External links
 Russian icons from the collection of Russian Museum

 
Russian Museum, Collections
Russian art